The Cambridge, Massachusetts municipal election of 2013 took place on Tuesday, November 5, 2013, to elect the nine members of the Cambridge City Council, and the School Committee.

Cambridge has a city government led by a mayor and nine-member city council. There is also a six-member School Committee which functions alongside the Superintendent of public schools. The councilors and school committee members are elected every two years using the single transferable vote system. Once a laborious process that took several days to complete by hand, ballot sorting and calculations to determine the outcome of elections are now quickly performed by computer, after the ballots have been optically scanned.

City Council candidates
Voters indicated order of preference (first choice, second choice, etc.). for the 25 candidates. Seven of the 25 candidates were members of the outgoing council.

References

Sources

Citations

External links
 City of Cambridge. 2013 Municipal Election Official Results
 Part I of a five-part series on Cambridge City Council election issues Harvard Crimson October 4, 2013
 Cambridge Candidate Pages – 2013 (via Internet Archive)
 City Council Candidates Cambridge Day
  (1941–present)

Government of Cambridge, Massachusetts
cambridge
cambridge